David Charles Giles (born 21 September 1956) is a Welsh former professional footballer and  Wales international. During his career he attained 12 caps for Wales, scoring on two occasions.

Career

Giles was a Welsh schoolboy international when he signed for Cardiff City. He made his debut for the Bluebirds in a 0–0 draw against Nottingham Forest in February 1975. Unable to hold down a permanent first team spot he left the club in December 1978 for £20,000 and joined Wrexham where he spent two years before again moving on, this time for £40,000 to Swansea City. He continued to move around in the next few seasons, playing for Leyton Orient on loan before moving to Crystal Palace and then Birmingham City.

After a spell at Newport County he returned to the club where he started his career, Cardiff City. Giles then played for Stroud.

He later joined Barry Town on a part-time basis eventually retiring there.

In 1994, he became manager of League of Wales side Ebbw Vale. He later had a short spell in charge of Inter Cardiff, jointly with his brother Paul.

After football

Giles was a regular analyst for ITV Wales on the late night football magazine show Wales Soccer Night until its axing in December 2005.

He also works as a journalist and previously wrote a regular sports column in the South Wales Echo covering Cardiff City and the Wales team.

References

1956 births
Living people
Footballers from Cardiff
Welsh footballers
Cardiff City F.C. players
Wrexham A.F.C. players
Swansea City A.F.C. players
Crystal Palace F.C. players
Leyton Orient F.C. players
Birmingham City F.C. players
Newport County A.F.C. players
Barry Town United F.C. players
Wales international footballers
Wales under-21 international footballers
English Football League players
Association football midfielders